Kani Bardeh (also Romanized as Kānī Bardeh; also known as Ḩoseyn Āvā) is a village in Beygom Qaleh Rural District, in the Central District of Naqadeh County, West Azerbaijan Province, Iran. At the 2006 census, its population was 39, in 7 families.

References 

Populated places in Naqadeh County